GVN may refer to 

 Gazet van Antwerpen, a Belgian newspaper
 Global value numbering
 Global Virus Network
 Global Volunteer Network
 Godavari railway station, in India
 Kuku Yalanji language
 Government of Viet Nam, used of South Vietnam, 1955-1975